The Cumberland Valley is a northern constituent valley of the Great Appalachian Valley,  within the Atlantic Seaboard watershed in Pennsylvania and Maryland. The Appalachian Trail crosses through the valley.

Geography

The valley is bound to the west and north by the Ridge-and-Valley Appalachians (Bear Pond Mountains/Blue Mountain), to the east and south by South Mountain, to the northeast by the Susquehanna River at Harrisburg, and to the south by the Potomac River. The portion of the valley residing in Maryland is sometimes referred to as the Hagerstown Valley.

The Cumberland Valley Railroad, the Cumberland Valley AVA wine region, and the Cumberland Valley School District are named for the region.

Settlements
Cities in the Cumberland Valley include Harrisburg, Pennsylvania, and Hagerstown, Maryland. Pennsylvania boroughs include Camp Hill, Mechanicsburg, Carlisle, Shippensburg, Chambersburg, Waynesboro,  and Greencastle.

See also
Great Appalachian Valley

References

External links

Cumberland Valley blog
History of the Cumberland Valley, Pennsylvania

Valleys of Pennsylvania
Valleys of Maryland
Landforms of Cumberland County, Pennsylvania
Landforms of Franklin County, Pennsylvania
Landforms of Washington County, Maryland
Regions of Maryland
Regions of Pennsylvania